John Redwine (born October 28, 1950) is an American physician and politician.

Biography
Born in Pratt, Kansas, Redwine received his bachelor's degree from University of Kansas, He then went to the University of Texas Health Science Center at Houston and Kansas City University of Medicine and Biosciences. He practiced  osteopathetic medicine in Sioux City, Iowa where he lived. Redwine served on the Sioux City Community School Board. From 1997 to 2003, Redwine served in the Iowa Senate from the 2nd District, and was a Republican.

Notes

1950 births
Living people
Politicians from Sioux City, Iowa
People from Pratt, Kansas
University of Kansas alumni
University of Texas Health Science Center at Houston alumni
Kansas City University of Medicine and Biosciences alumni
Physicians from Iowa
School board members in Iowa
Republican Party Iowa state senators